The year 1926 was marked by many events that left an imprint on the history of Soviet and Russian fine arts.

Events

 Association of artists Circle of Artists is founded in Leningrad. Alexander Samokhvalov, Vacheslav Pakulin, Alexei Pakhomov, Vladimir Malagis, Alexander Rusakov, Alexander Vedernikov and others belong to the circle.
 March 21 — Traditional exhibition of works by artists of the «Society of Arkhip Kuindzhi» was opened in Leningrad in the Academy of Arts. Exhibited 592 works of painting and sculpture of 65 authors. The participants were Mikhail Avilov, Efim Cheptsov, Alfred Eberling, Mikhail Platunov, Alexander Vakhrameev, Arcady Rylov, and other important Russian realist artists.
 May 3 — The VII Exhibition of AKhRR named «Life of the Peoples of the USSR» was opened in Moscow. Exhibited 1832 works of 294 authors. The participants were Mikhail Avilov, Abram Arkhipov, Isaak Brodsky, Aleksandr Gerasimov, Mitrofan Grekov, Nikolai Dormidontov, Efim Cheptsov, Alfred Eberling, Boris Ioganson, Alexander Lubimov, Arcady Rylov, Alexander Vakhrameev, and other important Russian artists.
 November 7 — A first monument to Vladimir Lenin was unveiled in Leningrad in front of Finland Station. Author of the monument sculptor S. Evseev and architects V. Shchuko and V. Gelfreykh.

Births
 January 31 — Lev Russov, Russian soviet painter, sculptor, and graphic artist (d. 1987).
 March 24 — Engels Kozlov, Russian soviet painter, People's Artist of the RSFSR (d.2007).

Deaths 
 March 16 — Alexander Vakhrameev, Russian painter and art educator (b. 1874).
 June 23 — Viktor Vasnetsov, Russian painter (b.1848).
 July 7 — Fyodor Schechtel,, Russian architect, graphic artist, and stage designer (b. 1859).
 October 22 — Ivan Velts, Russian painter (b.1866).

See also

 List of Russian artists
 List of painters of Leningrad Union of Artists
 Saint Petersburg Union of Artists
 Russian culture
 1926 in the Soviet Union

References

Sources
 VIII выставка картин и скульптуры АХРР «Жизнь и быт народов СССР». Справочник-каталог с иллюстрациями. М., АХРР, 1926.
 Каталог выставки картин Общества им. А. И. Куинджи в залах Академии художеств. Изд 2-е. Л., 1926.
 Каталог VI очередной выставки картин Общества художников-индивидуалистов. Л., 1926.
 Artists of Peoples of the USSR. Biography Dictionary. Vol. 1. Moscow, Iskusstvo, 1970.
 Artists of Peoples of the USSR. Biography Dictionary. Vol. 2. Moscow, Iskusstvo, 1972.
 Directory of Members of Union of Artists of USSR. Volume 1,2. Moscow, Soviet Artist Edition, 1979.
 Directory of Members of the Leningrad branch of the Union of Artists of Russian Federation. Leningrad, Khudozhnik RSFSR, 1980.
 Artists of Peoples of the USSR. Biography Dictionary. Vol. 4 Book 1. Moscow, Iskusstvo, 1983.
 Directory of Members of the Leningrad branch of the Union of Artists of Russian Federation. – Leningrad: Khudozhnik RSFSR, 1987.
 Персональные и групповые выставки советских художников. 1917-1947 гг. М., Советский художник, 1989.
 Artists of peoples of the USSR. Biography Dictionary. Vol. 4 Book 2. – Saint Petersburg: Academic project humanitarian agency, 1995.
 Link of Times: 1932 – 1997. Artists – Members of Saint Petersburg Union of Artists of Russia. Exhibition catalogue. – Saint Petersburg: Manezh Central Exhibition Hall, 1997.
 Matthew C. Bown. Dictionary of 20th Century Russian and Soviet Painters 1900-1980s. – London: Izomar, 1998.
 Vern G. Swanson. Soviet Impressionism. – Woodbridge, England: Antique Collectors' Club, 2001.
 Время перемен. Искусство 1960—1985 в Советском Союзе. СПб., Государственный Русский музей, 2006.
 Sergei V. Ivanov. Unknown Socialist Realism. The Leningrad School. – Saint-Petersburg: NP-Print Edition, 2007. – , .
 Anniversary Directory graduates of Saint Petersburg State Academic Institute of Painting, Sculpture, and Architecture named after Ilya Repin, Russian Academy of Arts. 1915 – 2005. – Saint Petersburg: Pervotsvet Publishing House, 2007.

Art
Soviet Union